NH 41 may refer to:
 National Highway 41 (India)
 New Hampshire Route 41 (U.S.)